Christian Hackl (born January 22, 1981) is an Austrian bobsledder who has competed since 2004. At the 2010 Winter Olympics, he finished 18th in the two-man event while crashing out in the four-man event.

Hackl finished 11th in the four-man event at the FIBT World Championships 2007 in St. Moritz. His best World Cup finish was 18th in the four-man event at Igls in January 2010.

References
 

1981 births
Austrian male bobsledders
Bobsledders at the 2010 Winter Olympics
Living people
Olympic bobsledders of Austria
Place of birth missing (living people)